The Republic of Korea Navy, the Defense Acquisition Program Administration (DAPA), and the Agency for Defense Development (ADD) of South Korea have been developing naval weaponry with local defense companies.

Notable weaponry

Notes

List of weaponry
Naval weapons of South Korea